Soul-Fire (also known as Soul Fire) is a 1925 American silent drama film starring Richard Barthelmess and Bessie Love. It was directed by John S. Robertson and was based on the Broadway production Great Music (1924) by Martin Brown.

The film was funded by Barthelmess through his Inspiration Pictures and released by First National Pictures.

Plot
Eric Fane (Barthelmess) leaves New York City and travels to Italy to study music composition. He then travels to Paris and Port Said, where he encounters women who inspire him to write new types of music. When he finally arrives in the South Seas, he meets Teita (Love), who inspires him to write the best music of all.

Cast

Actors Helen Ware, Harriet Sterling, Edward LaRoche, and Leah La Roux were all cast members of the original play.

Production
Most interiors were filmed at deForest Studios in Manhattan. Exteriors for the South Seas were shot throughout Florida.

An Italian restaurant in Manhattan served as the canteen for the production.

Reception
The film received generally positive reviews, with Barthelmess and Love receiving acclaim for their performances.

References

External links

 
 
 
 
 
 Lobby poster

1925 drama films
1925 films
American black-and-white films
Silent American drama films
American films based on plays
American silent feature films
Films directed by John S. Robertson
First National Pictures films
Surviving American silent films
1920s American films